Charles Dougherty may refer to:

Charles Dougherty (Georgia politician) (1801–1853), American politician from Georgia, Whig candidate for Governor of Georgia
Charles F. Dougherty (born 1937), U.S. Representative from Pennsylvania
Charles J. Dougherty (born 1949), President of Duquesne University in Pittsburgh, Pennsylvania
Charles Dougherty (Florida politician) (1850–1915), Democrat U.S. Representative from Florida
Charlie Dougherty (1862–1925), baseball player
Charles Dougherty (baseball) (1879–1939), American baseball player in the pre-Negro leagues
Charles B. Dougherty (1860–1924), officer in the Pennsylvania Army National Guard

See also
Charles Doherty (1855–1931), Canadian politician and jurist
Charles Doughty (disambiguation)